The Śāradā, Sarada or Sharada script is an abugida writing system of the Brahmic family of scripts. The script was widespread  between the 8th and 12th centuries in the northwestern parts of Indian Subcontinent (in Kashmir and neighbouring areas), for writing Sanskrit and Kashmiri. Originally more widespread, its use became later restricted to Kashmir, and it is now rarely used except by the Kashmiri Pandit community for religious purposes.

It is a native script of Kashmir and is named after the goddess Śāradā or Saraswati, the goddess of learning and the main deity of the Sharada Peeth temple.

History

The Bakhshali manuscript uses an early stage of the Sharada script. The Sharada script was used in Afghanistan as well as in the Himachal region in India. In Afghanistan, the Kabul Ganesh has a 6th to 8th century Proto-Sharada inscription mentioning the, Turk Shahis, king Khingala of Oddiyana.  At the historic Markula Devi Temple, the goddess Mahishamardini has a Sharada inscription of 1569 CE.

From the 10th century onwards, regional differences started to appear between the Sharada script used in Punjab, the Hill States (partly Himachal Pradesh) and Kashmir. Sharada proper was eventually restricted to very limited ceremonial use in Kashmir, as it grew increasingly unsuitable for writing the Kashmiri language. With the last known inscription dating to 1204 C.E., the early 13th century marks a milestone in the development of Sharada. The regional variety in Punjab continued to evolve from this stage through the 14th century; during this period it starts to appear in forms closely resembling Gurmukhī and other Landa scripts. By the 15th century, Sharada had evolved so considerably that epigraphists denote the script at this point by a special name, Devāśeṣa.

Letters

Vowels

Consonants

Numerals

Sharada script uses its own signs for the positional decimal numeral system.

Image gallery

Unicode 

Śāradā script was added to the Unicode Standard in January, 2012 with the release of version 6.1.

The Unicode block for Śāradā script, called Sharada, is U+11180–U+111DF:

See also
 Lipi – writing scripts in Buddhist, Hindu and Jaina texts
 Sharada Peeth in Kashmir

References

External links
Aksharamukha: Sharada script
Saerji. (2009). Śāradā script: Akṣara List of the Manuscript of Abhidharmadīpa (ca. the 11th Century). Research Institute of Sanskrit Manuscripts & Buddhist Literature, Peking University.
Prevalence of the Śāradā Script in Afghanistan

Brahmic scripts
Sarada scripts
History of Kashmir
Writing systems introduced in the 8th century